Wallumbilla South is a rural locality in the Maranoa Region, Queensland, Australia.

History 
The locality name is derived from town and parish, which in turn was a pastoral run name leased by naturalist Charles Coxen in the 1860s. The name is presumed to be from the Mandandanji language, wallu meaning plenty and billa meaning jew fish (possibly Argyrosomus japonicus).

Road infrastructure
The Warrego Highway runs along two small sections of the northern boundary.

References 

Maranoa Region
Localities in Queensland